Independence Party may refer to:

Active parties

Outside United States
 Independence Party (Egypt)
 Estonian Independence Party
 Independence Party (Finland)
 Independence Party (Iceland)
 Independence Party (Mauritius)
 Independence Party (Morocco)
 Puerto Rican Independence Party

 UK Independence Party

United States
 Alaskan Independence Party
 United Independent Party, Massachusetts
 Independence Party of Minnesota
 Independence Party of New York

Former parties
 Independence (Israeli political party)
 Independence Party (Lithuania)
 Independence Party (Mandatory Palestine)
 Irish Independence Party, Northern Ireland
 Korea Independence Party, South Korea
 Independence Party (United States)
 Independence Party of America, U.S.A.
 Taiwan Independence Party

See also
 Partit per la Independència, Catalonia